The Edison Electric Institute (EEI) is an association that represents all U.S. investor-owned electric companies.

Its members provide electricity for 220 million Americans, operate in 50 states and the District of Columbia, and directly employ more than one million workers.

EEI has 70 international electric companies as Affiliate Members, and 250 industry suppliers and related organizations as Associate Members.

Membership 
Members of the Edison Electric Institute are investor-owned utility companies, meaning that they are privately held companies that supply power and electricity to businesses and consumers.

Some of the larger members include:

 Alliant Energy
 American Electric Power
 Berkshire Hathaway Energy
 CenterPoint Energy
 CMS Energy (Consumers Energy)
 Consolidated Edison
 Duke Energy
 Entergy Corporation
 FirstEnergy
 PG&E Corporation
 Southern Company
 Xcel Energy

Issues

2017 tax cut 
The Tax Cuts and Jobs Act, the largest tax overhaul in 30 years, was passed by Congress and signed by President Trump at the end of 2017. The legislation had several provisions that benefit the electric industry: maintaining the federal income tax deduction for interest expense for regulated electric companies; maintaining the federal income tax deduction for state and local taxes; and providing for the “continuation of normalization, including addressing excess deferred taxes resulting from a reduction in the tax rate.”

Electric vehicles
On June 8, 2015, U.S. Energy Secretary Ernest Moniz and the Edison Electric Institute signed a memorandum of understanding (MOU) regarding plug-in electric vehicles (PEVs). The MOU sets up a collaboration between the government and EEI to make PEVs, by the year 2022, as affordable as regular gas-powered vehicles were in 2012. The Department of Energy runs an initiative called the "EV Everywhere Grand Challenge", which put forth the 2022 affordability goal. The program coincides with the popularity of electric vehicle sales, which have increased by 128 percent between 2012 and 2014.

EEI runs a program called the Employee PEV Engagement Initiative. The goal is to "increase electric vehicle readiness, especially in the workplace," according to the Department of Energy. According to the Department of Energy, Kate Brandt, Federal Chief Sustainability Officer at the White House Council on Environmental Quality, said, "Today's Memorandum of Understanding with the nation's electric power industry allows the Department of Energy to tap into the experience and scale of an industry that is truly leading the way in moving the electric vehicle market forward."

In pursuing the initiative, EEI and the DOE will work with other federal agencies including Department of Transportation (DOT), General Services Administration (GSA), Council on Environmental Quality (CEQ), and the White House.

Grid security 
The energy grid is a complex, interconnected network of generation, transmission, distribution, control, and communication technologies. Any of these can be damaged by either natural events or malicious attacks such as cyber or physical attacks. The electric power industry has engaged with a series of initiatives meant to protect the energy grid from these threats. The industry collaborates with the National Institute of Standards and Technology, the North American Electric Reliability Corporation, and federal intelligence and law enforcement agencies.

On September 20, 2018, EEI announced that it supported the Trump Administration's unveiled National Cyber Strategy. The protection of critical infrastructure such as the electric grid were included in the National Cyber Strategy.

Hurricane Maria 
After Hurricane Maria hit the island of Puerto Rico in 2017, the federal government invested $3.2 billion into restoring the island's power grid. The Edison Electric Institute deployed Carlos D. Torres, a retired vice president at Consolidated Edison, to Puerto Rico to coordinate storm rebuilding of the power grid. Subsequently, Torres was appointed by Gov. Ricardo Rossello as coordinator for storm restoration.

Unmanned aircraft
EEI supports the use of drones (unmanned aircraft systems, or UAS) by electric power companies to maintain electric grids and restore downed service. In July 2016, Congress passed legislation (H.R. 636) that "includes provisions supporting electric power companies utilizing unmanned aircraft systems (UAS) for energy grid maintenance and service restoration."

Renewable energy

Partnership with pro-environment group 
In February 2018, EEI and the Natural Resources Defense Council (NRDC), a non-profit international environmental advocacy group, released a joint statement outlining 21 policy priorities on which both organizations would work together to advance clean energy. Both organizations said the recommendations are designed to “accelerate the clean energy transition; promote investment in smarter energy infrastructure, while ensuring affordable and reliable electricity; and facilitate collaboratively developed rate design and regulatory reforms that accommodate rapid technology change and evolving customer expectations.”

Advocacy for changes to homeowner solar panel policies 
Between 2011 and 2017, rooftop solar panel installations had "explosive growth — as much as 900 percent by one estimate." But by 2017, the growth stopped. Saturation in certain markets, such as California, and financial problems at several of the top solar panel makers are the main factors that caused the decline in growth. But, according to the New York Times, "the decline has also coincided with a concerted and well-funded lobbying campaign by traditional utilities, which have been working in state capitals across the country to reverse incentives for homeowners to install solar panels." EEI has played a central role in a national U.S. campaign to reduce renewable energy incentives. However, the EEI has been successful in rolling back state-level incentives for rooftop solar energy.

Utilities are opposed to state rules, known as net metering, that are connected to homeowner-produced solar energy. Under net metering rules in many states, private solar customers can sell excess power they produce back to the grid at what is known as the "retail price," which is more than the utilities pay for the energy itself from energy producers. Utilities argue that this practice is unfair to homeowners who do not want or can't afford their own solar panels.

ESG reporting template 
In August 2018, EEI announced that it was launching an environmental, social, governance, and sustainability-related (ESG/sustainability) reporting template to help both consumers and the financial sector, the latter with "more uniform and consistent ESG/sustainability data and information." EEI had launched a similar program as a pilot program in 2017. The template is the first of its kind, being "the first and only industry-focused and investor-driven ESG reporting framework."

Foundation
The Edison Electric Institute runs the Edison Electric Institute for Electric Innovation foundation, a 501(c)(3) charitable organization. The foundation's main activities are research, holding conferences, giving grants, and outreach to outside parties and organizations. The foundation's three main goals are to educate the public about how electric power is produced, delivered, and used; help make the environment clean and safe; and to improve the quality of life for all people. The governing structure of the foundation is a board of directors composed of electric industry CEOs.

References

External links
 
 Troops to Energy Jobs Energy industry employment for veterans
 The Electric Generation People who support electricity as a vehicle fuel

Trade associations based in the United States
Organizations established in 1933
1933 establishments in the United States
Electric power in the United States
Lobbying organizations based in Washington, D.C.
501(c)(6) nonprofit organizations